Margaret Villa-Cryan (born December 21, 1924) is an American former utility player who played from  through  in the All-American Girls Professional Baseball League. She was born in Montebello, California and was of Mexican American descent.

A very versatile player, Marge Villa was one of the 39 players born in California to join the All-American Girls Professional Baseball League in its twelve years history. She entered the AAGPBL in 1946 with the Kenosha Comets, playing for them during her five years in the league, being used as a catcher, at second base and third base, as well as in the outfield corners, even though she claimed notoriety in a game during her rookie season.

On June 9, 1946, Villa made history in her own right, when she drove in nine runs and collected eleven total bases in a contest, setting two single-game league records that never would be surpassed.

In 1947, Villa had the chance to join the touring AAGPBL teams that traveled to Central and South America. After retirement, she focused much of her time and energy visiting friends and family and traveling to reunions of the AAGPBL Players Association.

Since 1988 Villa is part of Women in Baseball, a permanent display based at the Baseball Hall of Fame and Museum in Cooperstown, New York, which was unveiled to honor the entire All-American Girls Professional Baseball League rather than individual baseball personalities. Besides this, she spent countless hours responding to requests for autographs and corresponding with young athletes interested in hearing of her days in the league.

As of 2016, it was noted that Villa-Cryan was still playing golf into her 90s and still spent time referring to fan mail.

Career statistics
Batting 

Fielding

Sources

1924 births
Living people
All-American Girls Professional Baseball League players
American sportspeople of Mexican descent
Baseball players from California
Sportspeople from Montebello, California
21st-century American women